The Halle Steensland House (also known as the Bethel Parish Shoppe) is a historic house located at 315 North Carroll Street in Madison, Wisconsin, United States. It was added to the National Register of Historic Places on November 30, 1982. It is locally significant as one of the finest brick Queen Anne houses in Madison.

Description and history

The Queen Anne style house is a three-story structure constructed of wood frame with red brick veneer and stone trim, in a very eclectic adaptation of the style. It was designed by local architectural firm Gordon and Paunack, and was built in 1896 for Norwegian immigrant Halle Steensland. Steenland came to Madison in 1855, and later served as a U.S. Vice Consul in Sweden and Norway. On May 20, 1974, it was designated a landmark by the Madison Landmarks Commission.

The house has been owned by the Bethel Lutheran Church since 1958, when it became the Bethel Parish Shoppe. In 2015, they moved the house, from its location facing North Carroll Street, approximately 200 feet to a location in the same block but facing West Gorham Street. The church is planning to renovate the house for use as student housing.

See also

 National Register of Historic Places listings in Madison, Wisconsin

References

External links

Houses in Madison, Wisconsin
Houses on the National Register of Historic Places in Wisconsin
National Register of Historic Places in Madison, Wisconsin
Queen Anne architecture in Wisconsin
Houses completed in 1896